was the legendary first emperor of Japan according to the Nihon Shoki and Kojiki. His ascension is traditionally dated as 660 BC. In Japanese mythology, he was a descendant of the sun goddess Amaterasu, through her grandson Ninigi, as well as a descendant of the storm god Susanoo. He launched a military expedition from Hyūga near the Seto Inland Sea, captured Yamato, and established this as his center of power. In modern Japan, Emperor Jimmu's legendary accession is marked as National Foundation Day on February 11. Amidst nationalist sentiments during the 1930s and 1940s in Imperial Japan, it was dangerous to question the existence of Emperor Jimmu. 

Historians have stressed that there is no evidence for the existence of Emperor Jimmu with most scholars agreeing that he is a legendary figure. However, stories of him may reflect actual events.

The exact spot of Emperor Jimmu's accession to the imperial throne (i.e. the foundation of Japan) was debated for centuries until in 1863 scholars of national studies claimed to have identified an area within Kashihara as the exact location.

Name and title
Jimmu is recorded as Japan's first ruler in two early chronicles, Nihon Shoki (721) and Kojiki (712). Nihon Shoki gives the dates of his reign as 660–585 BC. Prior to this time, these rulers had been known as Sumera no mikoto/Ōkimi. This practice had begun under Empress Suiko, and took root after the Taika Reforms with the ascendancy of the Nakatomi clan.

Iware indicates a toponym (an old place name in the Nara region) whose precise purport is unclear.

The Imperial House of Japan traditionally based its claim to the throne on its putative descent from the sun-goddess Amaterasu via Jimmu's great-grandfather Ninigi.

Consorts and children
Consort: , Hosuseri's (Ninigi-no-Mikoto's son) daughter
First son: 
Son: 
Daughter: Princess Misaki (神武天皇)
Empress: , Kotoshironushi's daughter
Son: 
Second son: 
Third son: , later Emperor Suizei

Legendary narrative

In Japanese mythology, the Age of the Gods is the period before Jimmu's accession.

The story of Jimmu seems to rework legends associated with the Ōtomo clan (大伴氏), and its function was to establish that clan's links to the ruling family, just as those of Suijin arguably reflect Mononobe tales and the legends in Ōjin's chronicles seem to derive from Soga clan traditions. Jimmu figures as a direct descendant of the sun goddess, Amaterasu via the side of his father, Ugayafukiaezu. Amaterasu had a son called Ame no Oshihomimi no Mikoto and through him a grandson named Ninigi-no-Mikoto. She sent her grandson to the Japanese islands where he eventually married Konohana-Sakuya-hime. Among their three sons was Hikohohodemi no Mikoto, also called Yamasachi-hiko, who married Toyotama-hime. She was the daughter of Ryūjin, the Japanese sea god. They had a single son called Hikonagisa Takeugaya Fukiaezu no Mikoto. The boy was abandoned by his parents at birth and consequently raised by Tamayori-hime, his mother's younger sister. They eventually married and had four sons. The last of these, Kamu-yamato Iware-biko no mikoto, became Emperor Jimmu.

Migration

According to the chronicles Kojiki and Nihon Shoki, Jimmu's brothers Hikoitsuse, Inai, and Mikeirino were born in Takachiho, the southern part of Kyūshū in modern-day Miyazaki Prefecture. They moved eastward to find a location more appropriate for administering the entire country. Jimmu's older brother, Itsuse no Mikoto, originally led the migration, and led the clan eastward through the Seto Inland Sea with the assistance of local chieftain Sao Netsuhiko. As they reached Naniwa (modern-day Osaka), they encountered another local chieftain, Nagasunehiko ("the long-legged man"), and Itsuse was killed in the ensuing battle. Jimmu realized that they had been defeated because they battled eastward against the sun, so he decided to land on the east side of Kii Peninsula and to battle westward. They reached Kumano, and, with the guidance of a three-legged crow, Yatagarasu ("eight-span crow"), they moved to Yamato. There, they once again battled Nagasunehiko and were victorious. The record in the Nihon Shoki of Emperor Jimmu states that his armed forces defeated a group of  before his enthronement. The Emishi were an ethnic group who lived in Honshu, particularly the Tōhoku region.

In Yamato, who also claimed descent from the Takamagahara gods, was protected by Nagasunehiko. However, when Nigihayahi met Jimmu, he accepted Jimmu's legitimacy. At this point, Jimmu is said to have ascended to the throne of Japan. Upon scaling a Nara mountain to survey the Seto Inland Sea he now controlled, Jimmu remarked that it was shaped like the "heart" rings made by mating dragonflies, archaically akitsu 秋津. A mosquito then tried to steal Jimmu's royal blood but since Jimmu was a god incarnate Emperor, a dragonfly killed the mosquito. Japan thus received its classical name the Dragonfly Islands, .

According to the Kojiki, Jimmu died when he was 126 years old. The Emperor's posthumous name literally means "divine might" or "god-warrior". It is generally thought that Jimmu's name and character evolved into their present shape just before the time in which legends about the origins of the Yamato dynasty were chronicled in the Kojiki. There are accounts written earlier than either Kojiki and Nihon Shoki that present an alternative version of the story. According to these accounts, Jimmu's dynasty was supplanted by that of Ōjin, whose dynasty was supplanted by that of Keitai. The Kojiki and the Nihon Shoki then combined these three legendary dynasties into one long and continuous genealogy.

The traditional site of Jimmu's grave is near Mount Unebi in Kashihara, Nara Prefecture.

Modern veneration

Veneration of Jimmu was a central component of the imperial cult that formed following the Meiji Restoration. In 1873, a holiday called Kigensetsu was established on February 11. The holiday commemorated the anniversary of Jimmu's ascension to the throne 2,532 years earlier. After World War II, the holiday was criticized as too closely associated with the "emperor system." It was suspended from 1948 to 1966, but later reinstated as National Foundation Day.

Between 1873 and 1945 an imperial envoy sent offerings every year to the supposed site of Jimmu's tomb. In 1890 Kashihara Shrine was established nearby, on the spot where Jimmu was said to have ascended to the throne.

Before and during World War II, expansionist propaganda made frequent use of the phrase hakkō ichiu, a term coined by Tanaka Chigaku based on a passage in the Nihon Shoki discussing Emperor Jimmu. Some media incorrectly attributed the phrase to Emperor Jimmu. For the 1940 Kigensetsu celebration, marking the supposed 2,600th anniversary of Jimmu's enthronement, the Peace Tower was constructed in Miyazaki.

The same year numerous stone monuments relating to key events in Jimmu's life were erected around Japan. The sites at which these monuments were erected are known as Emperor Jimmu Sacred Historical Sites.

Historicity 
There is no evidence Jimmu existed, except the mention in the Nihon Shoki and Kojiki. The dates of Jimmu reigning from 660 BC to 585 BC are improbable, and most modern scholars agree that the traditional founding of the Yamato dynasty in 660 BC is a myth and that Jimmu along with the first nine emperors are legendary. The founding of Japan in the year 660 BC was probably created by the writers of Nihon Shoki to put the date on a kanototori year.

However, the stories of Jimmu may reflect real events of the mid to late Yayoi period. According to historian Peter Wetzler, Jimmu’s conquest of Osaka and Nara may reflect an actual event. Still, the dates and many of the details are fictitious. Historian Kenneth G. Henshall stated that Jimmu’s conquest may also reflect a time when the Yayoi people from continental Asia immigrated in masses starting from Kyushu and moving eastward during the Yayoi period.

The legend of Jimmu is a mixture of myth with some plausible history. For example, the sheer complexity of the lineage and mundanity of the legend argues that it could have some basis in reality. If Jimmu was wholly fictional then it would've been easier to describe him as a direct descendant of a god. The three-legged crow Yatagarasu could be a metaphor. The weapons, tactics and route used by Jimmu are plausible. The Japanese monarchy still uses the three sacred treasures, although the original sword was reportedly lost around 1185 and the current one may be a replica. Emperor Sujin's historicity is considered possible by historians, while Emperor Kinmei is the first verifiable historical figure in the Yamato lineage. It could also be that emperors associated themselves with historic or fictional heroic figures in the past to legitimize their reign.

Some scholars also argue that there may have been a real person behind the legendary figure. He could have been a local ruler who conquered the area near Kashihara after 62 BC. If he was ever present in Miyazaki some scholars believe he was there during the first century BC while others say he was there during the third or fourth century AD.

He may have been a composite of Suijin and Kentai. The Japanese historian Ino Okifu identifies Emperor Jimmu with the Chinese alchemist and explorer Xu Fu (255–195 BC), a hypothesis supported by certain traditions in Japan and regarded as possible by some modern scholars. The Yayoi period (300 BC–300 AD), during which significant changes in Japanese metallurgy and pottery occurred, started around the time of his supposed arrival. However, the legend of Xu Fu's voyage also has numerous inconsistencies with the linguistic and anthropological history of Japan.

In 1940 Japan celebrated the 2600th anniversary of Jimmu's ascension and built a monument to Hakkō ichiu despite the fact that all historians knew Jimmu was a legendary figure. In 1941 the Japanese government charged the one historian who dared to challenge Jimmu's existence publicly, Tsuda Sōkichi.

Family tree

See also

 Modern system of ranked Shinto shrines
 Japanese imperial year
 National Foundation Day
 Jōmon period
 Yayoi period
 Emishi people
 Order of the Golden Kite

Notes

References

Bibliography

 
 Brown, Delmer M. and Ichirō Ishida, eds. (1979).  Gukanshō: The Future and the Past. Berkeley: University of California Press. ;  
 Brownlee, John S. (1997). Japanese Historians and the National Myths, 1600–1945: The Age of the Gods. Vancouver: University of British Columbia Press. 
 
 Earhart, David C. (2007).  Certain Victory: Images of World War II in the Japanese Media.  Armonk, New York: M. E. Sharpe.  
 Kitagawa, Joseph Mitsuo (1987). On Understanding Japanese Religion. Princeton: Princeton University Press. ; ;  
 }
 Ponsonby-Fane, Richard Arthur Brabazon (1959).  The Imperial House of Japan. Kyoto: Ponsonby Memorial Society. 
 }

External links
 A more detailed profile of Jimmu (archived April 2011)
 A detailed summary of Jimmu's descent legend (archived July 2014)

Legendary Emperors of Japan
Longevity myths
People of Jōmon-period Japan
Founding monarchs
Legendary progenitors
Legendary monarchs